The rivalry between Flamengo and Atlético Mineiro is a footballing rivalry played between Brazilian clubs Clube de Regatas do Flamengo, from Rio de Janeiro, and Clube Atlético Mineiro, from Belo Horizonte. The clubs first played against each other in 1929, but until regular competitions were introduced in Brazilian football in 1959, the encounters were played at friendly level, since they come from different states: Flamengo is from Rio de Janeiro, while Atlético Mineiro hails from Minas Gerais. The rivalry developed in the 1980s from numerous controversial encounters between the two clubs in that decade's Brasileirão and Copa Libertadores editions. It remained through the following years, and is considered the biggest interstate rivalry in Brazilian football.

History 

The first encounter between the two teams happened on 16 June 1929, a friendly in Atlético's home ground, the Presidente Antônio Carlos stadium, which Flamengo won 3–2. Atlético's first victory came in 1934, 3–1 in Rio de Janeiro, also in friendly game. The first regular national championship in Brazilian football was the Taça Brasil, introduced in 1959. Until then, matches between clubs from the states of Rio de Janeiro and Minas Gerais were mostly friendly, with an exception happening during the 1937 Copa dos Campeões Estaduais. The first time Flamengo and Atlético played for a national competition was on 2 April 1967, for that year's Torneio Roberto Gomes Pedrosa, a match which Atlético won 3–1 at the Mineirão. The clubs also took part in the Torneio do Povo, a competition organised by the Brazilian Sports Confederation from 1971 to 1973 between Brazil's most popular football clubs. Flamengo won the 1972 edition of the tournament, played in a single round-robin, with Atlético Mineiro finishing as runner-up.

A charity match played between the two clubs in 1979, in which Pelé played for Flamengo, helped ignite the rivalry. The match was won by the Rio de Janeiro club 5–1, and Atlético Mineiro players were irritated by what they saw as "excessive force" for a friendly game. The rivalry, however, truly commenced in the 1980s, when both Atlético and Flamengo had strong teams and provided many players to the Brazil national team. In 1980, the teams were finalists of the Campeonato Brasileiro Série A, Atlético's third final and Flamengo's first. Atlético had the best record in the first stages of the competition, but Flamengo had the best one in the second, which meant the latter could tie the final series to win the title. Atlético won the first leg 1–0 at the Mineirão, but in the second leg, played at the Maracanã, Flamengo won 3–2 with a late goal by Nunes and won its first Série A. During the match, three Atlético players were sent off, among them Reinaldo, who received a straight red card after scoring twice.

As Brasileirão champion and runner-up, both clubs qualified for the 1981 Copa Libertadores, in which they were drawn in a group with Paraguayan teams Olimpia and Cerro Porteño. The two encounters between the Brazilian clubs ended 2–2, and both won two and drew two matches against the Paraguayans. A play-off match in a neutral stadium had to be played between Atlético and Flamengo to decide which one would advance to the semifinals.

The match was played on 21 August at the Serra Dourada Stadium, in Goiânia, a ground selected by Flamengo. Atlético chose the referee of the encounter, José Roberto Wright. In the match, Atlético forward and best player Reinaldo received a straight red card from after fouling Flamengo's Zico at 33 minutes, in what was described as a "normal" foul and "without much violence". After the foul, Wright then sent off Atlético player Éder for complaining, after which the game was stopped. A turmoil started, in which Atlético's Palhinha and Chicão were also sent off, for insulting the referee. Left with seven players, Atlético's goalkeeper João Leite simulated an injury at the restart of the match, but Wright refused to stop the game. Atlético defender Osmar then held the ball with his hands, preventing the restart, for which he too was sent off and the match ended at the 37-minute mark, because Atlético had less than seven players on the field. The match ended in a 0–0 draw, which meant qualification for Flamengo, as it had the best goal difference in the group stage.

Atlético tried to appeal to a CONMEBOL court for annulment of the match, unsuccessfully. According to Wright, who until before the match was considered the country's best referee, Reinaldo's foul was indeed "normal" but he was sent off because of a previous warning. He also stated that Éder, Palhinha and Chicão were "stickers to indiscipline", and that he had to send Éder off as to not lose control of the match. The episode and referee Wright's performance were described by Brazilian and South American media as "shameful", "deplorable" and "opprobrium". Flamengo advanced to the semi-finals and went on to win the competition.

From then on, enmity marked the encounters between the two clubs in the 1980s, a fact that remained over the following decades. In the 1986 Brasileirão, Atlético eliminated Flamengo in the round of 16, winning the second leg 1–0 at the Mineirão, after a 0–0 draw at Maracanã. In the following year, Flamengo eliminated Atlético in the semi-finals of the Copa União, winning both legs, 3–2 in the first at the Mineirão, and 1–0 at the Maracanã.

The rivalry's biggest rout happened in the 2004 Campeonato Brasileiro, in a match played at the Ipatingão, won by Atlético 6–1. In 2006, Flamengo once again eliminated Atlético in a knockout stage, this time the quarter-finals of the Copa do Brasil, with a 4–1 aggregate score. In 2009, while both teams were in contention for the Série A title, a 3–1 Flamengo victory at the Mineirão, for the competition's 34th round, proved significant for the outcome of the season. The encounter, which included an olympic goal by Flamengo's Dejan Petković (who had played for the Belo Horizonte club in the previous season), marked Atlético's decline and Flamengo's rise in the competition. Prior to the game, Atlético was third and Flamengo fourth in the league table, with the positions being reversed after the match. Eventually, Atlético finished the season in seventh place after losing its four remaining matches, while Flamengo were crowned champions for the sixth time.

Three years later, Ronaldinho unilaterally ended his contract with Flamengo, claiming lack of payment by the club. A few days later, he joined Atlético, a move which prompted Flamengo director Zinho to say that he wanted "any team except Atlético" to win that year's Brasileirão. Atlético eventually finished second in the competition behind Flamengo's local rivals Fluminense, but Ronaldinho won three titles with the Minas Gerais club, including the 2013 Copa Libertadores. In the 2014 Copa do Brasil semi-finals between the two clubs, Flamengo won the first leg at the Maracanã 2–0, and scored first in the second one at the Mineirão. Atlético managed to make a 4–1 comeback with three goals in the second half and a 4–3 aggregate score, to advance to the finals, which it won.

In 2021 Brasileirão, Atlético won the league after 50 years and Flamengo were the runners-up.

Beginning the 2022 season Atlético, which won both the Brazilian League and Brazilian Cup in 2021, and Flamengo (which were the runners-up in the league and, by regulation, won the right to play, as Atlético won the National Triple) played in a neutral field, Arena Pantanal, the Supercopa do Brasil Final. After a draw on regular time, Atlético won the Cup after an exciting penalty shootout (8-7).

Results summary 

Sources: Flapédia and Galo Digital

Titles comparison

Note (1): The Flamengo considers the Copa União as a Brazilian Championship but, although the Copa União is considered an official title, it is not officially considered a Brazilian Championship. That makes the Flamengo officially have 7 Brazilian Championship.  

Note (2): Although the Intercontinental Cup and the FIFA Club World Cup are officially different tournaments, in Brazil they are treated many times as the same tournament.

Records

Scores and sequences 
Biggest win:
For Flamengo: Flamengo 5–1 Atlético Mineiro, (friendlies, 20 December 1930 and 6 April 1979);
For Atlético Mineiro: Atlético Mineiro 6–1 Flamengo (2004 Campeonato Brasileiro Série A, 14 November 2004).
Biggest Campeonato Brasileiro Série A win:
For Flamengo: Flamengo 4–1 Atlético Mineiro, (2001 Campeonato Brasileiro Série A, 25 June 2011);
For Atlético Mineiro: Atlético Mineiro 6–1 Flamengo, (2004 Campeonato Brasileiro Série A, 14 November 2004).
Biggest Copa do Brasil win:
For Flamengo: Flamengo 4–1 Atlético Mineiro (2006 Copa do Brasil quarter-finals, first leg, 26 April 2006);
For Atlético Mineiro: Atlético Mineiro 4–1 Flamengo, (2014 Copa do Brasil semi-finals, second leg, 5 November 2014).
Biggest unbeaten run:
For Flamengo: 7 games (15 November 1955 to 6 February 1966, and 1 June 1980 to 7 March 1982);
For Atlético Mineiro: 6 games (16 November 1966 to 15 October 1969, 14 March 1982 to 1 November 1987, 7 September 1989 to 19 November 1995).
Most consecutive wins:
For Flamengo: 4 wins (8 August 1996 to 3 October 1998);
For Atlético Mineiro: 4 wins (5 November 2014 to 20 September 2015).

Attendance 
The following are the ten best-attended matches of the encounter.

References

CR Flamengo
Clube Atlético Mineiro
Brazilian football derbies